Ubiquitin carboxyl-terminal hydrolase 2 is an enzyme that in humans is encoded by the USP2 gene.

Ubiquitin (MIM 191339), a highly conserved protein involved in the regulation of intracellular protein breakdown, cell cycle regulation, and stress response, is released from degraded proteins by disassembly of the polyubiquitin chains. The disassembly process is mediated by ubiquitin-specific proteases (USPs). Also see USP1 (MIM 603478).[supplied by OMIM]

References

Further reading